Caladenia insularis, commonly known as French island spider orchid is a plant in the orchid family Orchidaceae and is endemic to Victoria. It is a ground orchid with a single leaf and usually only one cream-coloured, pink or pale yellow flower, heavily streaked with red. It is only known from French Island.

Description
Caladenia insularis is a terrestrial, perennial, deciduous, herb with a spherical underground tuber. The flowers are cream-coloured, pink or pale yellow flower heavily streaked with red. The sides of the labellum have short, blunt, dark red teeth, its tip is rolled under and there are four or six well-spaced rows of calli along its mid-line. Flowering occurs in September and October.

Taxonomy and naming
Caladenia insularis  was first formally described in 1991 by Geoffrey Carr from a specimen collected near The Pinnacles on French Island and the description was published in Indigenous Flora and Fauna Association Miscellaneous Paper 1. The specific epithet (insularis) is a Latin word meaning "of an island".

Distribution and habitat
French Island spider orchid grows in heath on French Island and flowering seems to be stimulated by disturbance such as fire or mowing.

Conservation
Caladenia insularis is listed as  "threatened" under the Victorian Flora and Fauna Guarantee Act 1988 and as "vulnerable" under the Australian Government Environment Protection and Biodiversity Conservation Act 1999. The main threats to the species are weed invasion and grazing by goats, deer and rabbits.

References

insularis
Plants described in 1991
Endemic orchids of Australia
Orchids of Victoria (Australia)